Saffron Technology, Inc., is a technology company headquartered in Cary, North Carolina, that develops cognitive computing systems that use incremental learning to understand and unify by entity (person, place or thing) the connections between an entity and other “things” in data, along with the context of their connections and their raw frequency counts. Saffron learns from all sources of data including structured and unstructured data to support knowledge-based decision making. Its patented technology captures the connections between data points at the entity level and stores these connections in an associative memory. Similarity algorithms and predictive analytics are then combined with the associative index to identify patterns in the data. Saffron’s Natural Intelligence platform was utilized across industries including manufacturing, energy, defense and healthcare, to help decision-makers manage risks, identify opportunities and anticipate future outcomes, thus reducing cost and increasing productivity. Its competitors include IBM Watson and Grok. Intel purchased the company in 2015, then shuttered it less than 3 years later.

History

Saffron was founded in 1999 by Dr Manuel Aparicio, and Mr. James Fleming.

In 2000, former National Security Advisor Admiral (Dr.) John Poindexter joined the board with a focus of applying Associative Memory technology in the fields of National Security and Intelligence.

In the first years, the company did most of its work with the U.S. Department of Defense, including in Iraq, analysing and predicting where IED’s would be located so insurgent bombers could be proactively targeted.

In 2010, the analyst firm Gartner identified Saffron as a "Cool Vendor" in Information Infrastructure for Enterprise Information Management 

In 2011, Forrester Research highlighted Saffron Technology as the leader of associative indexing in "The Dawning of a New Age in BI DBMS".

On March 3, 2014 Saffron Technology raised a round of Series B funding.

In October 2015, Intel bought Saffron Technology for an undisclosed price. Intel offered the licensed software with engineering services contracted to develop client applications and support ongoing use.

In August 2018, Intel discontinued the Saffron software offering and supporting engineering services. Intel never issued a press release; it either reassigned or laid off all supporting staff and redirected the original URL to one that does not acknowledge Saffron's existence

Executives

Gayle Sheppard, chairman and chief executive officer; former executive at PeopleSoft, Pleasanton, CA. and J.D. Edwards and Company, Denver, CO.

Manuel Aparicio, Ph.D., chief memory maker and evangelist, former chief scientist at IBM Knowledge Management and Intelligent Agent Center, Raleigh, NC.

James Fleming, chief software engineer, former software developer at IBM Knowledge Management and Intelligent Agent Center, Raleigh, NC.

National security

During the Iraqi insurgency Saffron was used by coalition forces in Iraq to help identify entities that were defined as people, places and things involved in insurgent networks. The tool mimicked human memory by recalling associations between those people, places and things. Unlike other tools, Saffron focused on context and frequency of association. Each word representing an entity in a set of data had its own memory about all the other words it had been used in association with. In this way, the tool could learn the way humans did.

Saffron was contracted by DARPA to work on Project Genoa.

Industry

Saffron's Natural Intelligence platform is utilized by Global 1000 companies across industries including manufacturing, energy, defense and healthcare, to help decision-makers manage risks, identify opportunities and anticipate future outcomes, thus reducing cost and increasing productivity.

A Global 100 manufacturing company uses Saffron Technology in a number of operational areas to leverage past engineering decisions and business experiences, such as component and part order optimization, failure root-cause analysis, and predictive maintenance.

References

Computer memory companies
Intel acquisitions